Hungry Kids of Hungary is the debut EP from Brisbane indie-pop band Hungry Kids of Hungary.

At the Q Song Awards of 2009, "Set It Right" won Alternative Song of the Year.

Track listing
 "All You Need to Know"
 "Set It Right"
 "One By One"
 "Arrest This Heart"
 "Tell Me Twice"
 "Lenny"

Credits
 All songs written by Hungry Kids of Hungary
 Mastered by Matt Gray
 Photos by Dickens

Musicians
 Ben Dalton (bass)
 Kane Mazlin (keys, lead vocal on 1, 4 and 6)
 Dean McGrath (guitar and lead vocal on 2, 3 and 5)
 Ryan Strathie (drums)

References

2008 debut EPs
Indie pop EPs
EPs by Australian artists
Hungry Kids of Hungary albums